Dreamgirls: Original Broadway Cast Album is the cast album for the original Broadway production of the musical Dreamgirls, which debuted at the Imperial Theatre on December 20, 1981. Issued by David Geffen, a co-financier of the musical and later producer of its 2006 film adaptation, the album was released by his Geffen Records label on April 14, 1982. The cast album features performances by the show's performers, including Jennifer Holliday, Sheryl Lee Ralph, Loretta Devine, Ben Harney, Cleavant Derricks, Obba Babatundé, and Vondie Curtis-Hall.

Album information
The cast album includes highlights from the musical's score; many numbers were truncated or excised in order to fit onto one long-playing vinyl record. A 2006 special edition remastered version, issued to tie-in with both the musical's 25th anniversary and the DreamWorks/Paramount-produced Dreamgirls feature film adaptation, adds three previously unissued tracks from the original recording sessions. Also included is a bonus disc featuring instrumental mixes (prepared for personal appearances by the cast) and a dance version of the musical's signature number, "And I Am Telling You I'm Not Going".

Pop music producer David Foster served as producer of the cast album, which peaked at #11 on the Billboard 200, while peaking at #4 on Billboard's Black Albums Chart. It is the highest charting Broadway Cast Recording in history on the Billboard 200. In 1983, the album won the Grammy Award for Best Musical Show Album, and Jennifer Holliday received the Grammy Award for Best R&B Vocal Performance, Female for "And I Am Telling You I'm Not Going".

In 1993, the album was certified gold by the RIAA, and to date has sold over 500,000 copies in the US.

The special edition version of the cast album was issued by Decca Broadway and Hip-O Records on November 21, 2006. The dance remix of "And I Am Telling You..." was produced by Craig C.

Track listing
All songs written by Henry Krieger and Tom Eyen.

Side one
"Move (You're Steppin' on My Heart)" – 1:56
"Fake Your Way to the Top" – 2:27
"Cadillac Car" – 3:32
"Steppin' to the Bad Side" – 3:44
"Family" – 3:19
"Dreamgirls" – 3:14
"Press Conference – 1:40
"And I Am Telling You I'm Not Going" – 4:05

Side two
"Ain't No Party" – 2:08
"When I First Saw You" – 2:41
"I Am Changing" – 3:59
"I Meant You No Harm" – 1:05
"The Rap" – 1:41
"Firing of Jimmy" – 2:36
"I Miss You Old Friend" – 1:33
"One Night Only" – 3:42
"Hard to Say Goodbye, My Love" – 3:36

2006 Special Edition
All songs written by Henry Krieger and Tom Eyen.

Disc one
"Move (You're Steppin' on My Heart)"
"Fake Your Way to the Top"
"Cadillac Car"
"Steppin' to the Bad Side"
"Family"
"Dreamgirls"
"Press Conference"
"Driving Down the Strip" 1
"It's All Over" 1
"And I Am Telling You I'm Not Going"
"Ain't No Party"
"When I First Saw You"
"I Am Changing"
"I Meant You No Harm"
"The Rap"
"Firing of Jimmy"
"I Miss You Old Friend"
"One Night Only"
"Hard To Say Goodbye, My Love"
"Dreamgirls (Finale)" 1

Disc two
"Cadillac Car" (Instrumental)
"Steppin' to the Bad Side" (Instrumental)
"Family" (Instrumental)
"Dreamgirls" (Instrumental)
"And I Am Telling You I'm Not Going" (Instrumental)
"When I First Saw You" (Instrumental)
"I Am Changing" (Instrumental)
"One Night Only" (Instrumental)
"Hard to Say Goodbye, My Love" (Instrumental)
"And I Am Telling You I'm Not Going" (Craig C. Club Mix)

Notes
1: Previously unreleased

Personnel

Chart history

Album

Songs

References

Dreamgirls
Cast recordings
Albums produced by David Foster
1982 soundtrack albums
Theatre soundtracks
Geffen Records soundtracks
Pop soundtracks
Rhythm and blues soundtracks
Soul soundtracks
Grammy Award for Best Musical Theater Album